A Castle in Italy is a 2013 French drama film directed by Valeria Bruni Tedeschi. It was nominated for the Palme d'Or at the 2013 Cannes Film Festival.

Plot
An upper-middle-class family is selling their family home. Meanwhile, Louise meets Nathan while taking care of her brother Ludovic, who is ill.

Cast
 Louis Garrel as Nathan
 Valeria Bruni Tedeschi as Louise
 Xavier Beauvois as Serge
 Céline Sallette as Jeanne 
 Filippo Timi as Ludovic
 André Wilms as André
 Marie Rivière as Nathan's mother 
 Pippo Delbono as The priest
 Silvio Orlando as  The Italian mayor

References

External links
 

2013 films
2013 drama films
French drama films
2010s French-language films
Films directed by Valeria Bruni Tedeschi
2010s French films